Song Donglun (born 26 April 1991, Beijing) is a Chinese water polo player.  She competed in women's national water polo team on behalf of the People's Republic of China during the London 2012 and Rio de Janeiro 2016 Summer Olympics. She and China's women's national water polo team ranked in 5th place at the 2012 Summer Olympics and 7th at the 2016 games. She is 5 ft 10 inches tall.

See also
 List of World Aquatics Championships medalists in water polo
 Chinese Athletic Association

References

External links
 

Chinese female water polo players
1991 births
Living people
Olympic water polo players of China
Water polo players at the 2012 Summer Olympics
Water polo players at the 2016 Summer Olympics
Asian Games medalists in water polo
Water polo players at the 2010 Asian Games
Water polo players at the 2014 Asian Games
Asian Games gold medalists for China
Medalists at the 2010 Asian Games
Medalists at the 2014 Asian Games
World Aquatics Championships medalists in water polo
Universiade medalists in water polo
Universiade gold medalists for China
Medalists at the 2011 Summer Universiade

Sportspeople from Beijing
21st-century Chinese women